

B 
 Bian Que （扁鹊）(ca. 500 B.C.). – TCM physician

C 
 Buwei Yang Chao (1889–1981)
 Dr. Margaret Chan (陳馮富珍) – Current Director-General of the WHO (4 January 2007 – 30 June 2012)
 Chen Cheng – 陈承

G 
 Gao Yaojie （高耀洁医生）
 Ge Hong

H 
 Hua Tuo （华佗）(ca. 110–207). – TCM physician
 Dr. Kuan Huang (黄宽医生)
 Huangfu Mi (皇甫謐) (215–282 CE) – Expert in acupuncture

J 
 Ji Ben (吉本)( – 200)
 Jiang Yanyong （蒋彦永医生）1931–

L 
 Li Shizhen （李时珍）(1518–1593) – TCM physician
 Lin Qiaozhi （林巧稚） – Gynecologist
 Liu Wansu （刘完素）

M 
 Ma Xiaonian (1945 –   )

N 
 Ngeow Sze Chan (饒師泉)(1915–2002)

S 
 Sun Simiao （孙思邈）581–682 – TCM physician
 Song Ci （宋慈） – Forensic expert

T 
 Tang Zonghai – early advocate for the integration of Chinese and Western medicine

W 
 Zhen-yi Wang
 Wong Fei Hung （黄飞鸿）(1847–1924) – TCM physician
 Wang Zhongcheng （王忠诚医生） – Neurosurgeon
 Charles Wang (王志伟)

Z 
 Zhang Zhongjing （张仲景）150–219 – TCM physician
 Zhi Gang Sha 2002 Qigong Master of the Year